Ilya Gennadievich Konovalov (born 13 July 1998) is a Russian professional ice hockey goaltender currently playing for HC Dynamo Moscow of the Kontinental Hockey League (KHL).

Playing career
Konovalov made his professional debut in his native Russia, with Lokomotiv Yaroslavl in the Kontinental Hockey League. He won the Rookie of the Year award for the 2018–19 KHL season.

He was selected by the Edmonton Oilers in the third-round, 85th overall, of the 2019 NHL Entry Draft.

Following his fourth season with Lokomotiv, Konovalov left at the conclusion of his contract and was signed to a two-year, entry-level contract with the Edmonton Oilers on 3 May 2021. In his first North American season in 2021–22, Konovalov was assigned by the Oilers to American Hockey League (AHL) affiliate, the Bakersfield Condors for the entirety of the campaign. He made 17 appearances with the Condors, posting a 5-7-5 record with a 2.73 goals against average.

On 1 May 2022, Konovalov's KHL rights were traded from Lokomotiv to Dynamo Moscow in exchange for financial compensation. On 8 June 2022, Konovalov's tenure with the Oilers ended as he was placed on unconditional waivers in order to mutually terminate the remaining year of his contract. On 12 June 2022, Konovalov was signed to a two-year contract with Dynamo Moscow through 2024.

Career statistics

References

External links
 

1998 births
Living people
Bakersfield Condors players
HC Dynamo Moscow players
Edmonton Oilers draft picks
Lokomotiv Yaroslavl players
Russian ice hockey goaltenders
HC Ryazan players
Sportspeople from Yaroslavl